Activating Protein 2 (AP-2) is a family of closely related transcription factors which plays a critical role in regulating gene expression during early development.

References

External links
 

Gene expression
Transcription factors